Professor Kapila G. A. Gunasekara is  a Sri Lankan academic. He was the first Vice Chancellor of the University of Vocational Technology (UNIVOTEC), Sri Lanka. A Professor of Agriculture, he was the Vice Chancellor of the University of Peradeniya from 2000 to 2006. Before serving as the vice chancellor of the Peradeniya University , he also served as the Dean of the Faculty of  Agriculture.

He was born in Galle District and received his school education at Mahinda College, Galle.

References

Living people
Sinhalese academics
Alumni of the University of Peradeniya
People from Galle
Alumni of Mahinda College
Vice-Chancellors of the University of Peradeniya
Agricultural engineers
Year of birth missing (living people)
Sri Lankan academics
Academics from Galle